The Norfolk and Western Railway's M, M1 and M2 classes were a series of 4-8-0 steam locomotives owned and operated by the Norfolk and Western Railway.

Overview

Initially designed as mainline freight power, 125 class M 4-8-0s were built between 1906 and 1907. Though not revolutionary in design, these locomotives offered greater power and better riding qualities in comparison to the N&W’s 2-8-0s of the time. They would ultimately prove to be a mainstay of N&W motive power, working in mainline, transfer, switching, and branch line service. Many members of the class would undergo modifications over the years, such as the addition of higher-capacity tenders, installation of power reverse gear, superheating, and the replacement of the original Stephenson valve gear with that of the Baker type. Popular in service, crews would come to affectionately nickname the locomotives “Mollies,” a moniker which stuck until their retirement in the late 1950s.

Following the initial success of the class Ms, the N&W would order more 4-8-0s of nearly identical design in the form of the M1s in 1907. These differed in their use of Walschaerts valve gear and piston valves in place of slide valves. This design change, however, severely affected the locomotives’ performance, largely due to a poorly-executed design. The valves’ centerlines, being offset from those of the pistons, resulted in excess running gear wear and improper valve timing. Unsurprisingly, as older motive power on the N&W would be phased out, the M1s were among the first to go.

Design shortcomings would plague the subsequent class of 4-8-0s, the M2s, as well. From their arrival in 1910, issues with poor riding qualities and steaming were apparent. Though utilizing a larger boiler than either the Ms or M1s, the M2s possessed a relatively small heating surface area in the firebox, resulting in considerable difficulty in maintaining steam. In spite of the issues (along with subsequent unsuccessful modifications), the M2s lasted in service for considerably longer than the M1s, being among the few larger examples of non-articulated freight power owned by the N&W. The last examples lasted in service until the late 1950s.

Experiments

When larger locomotives arrived on the N&W, some of the M's were sent to work in switching and transfer service. After World War II, however, the N&W began exploring potential replacements, as many of the M’s had begun to show their age; the locomotives also failed to meet smoke abatement laws in many of the cities along the N&W network. In an experiment to address both issues, M2s Nos. 1100 and 1112 were extensively modified between 1947 and 1948, with No. 1100 being modified first. The boilers of both locomotives were rebuilt with shorter flues and combustion chambers. Induced draft fans, driven by steam turbines, were installed, along with mechanical stokers and water level controls; these were added so the locomotives could be left alone for long periods of time and gave rise to the nickname "Automatic Switcher”. Both locomotives were also fitted out with mechanical lubrication and modified tenders, providing an increase in water and coal capacity. 

Though extensive, the experiment ultimately proved to be a short-lived failure. Several issues became apparent shortly after No. 1100 reentered service. The blades of the induced-draft fan were quickly eroded by cinders from the locomotive’s fire, and the relatively soft exhaust from the locomotive lead to smoke and ash becoming a frequent source of discomfort for crews. In spite of changes to the design with No. 1112, including increases in heating surface and boiler pressure, along with the installation of a cinder collector to return cinders to the firebox ahead of the induced-draft fan, both locomotives were retired in 1951. The issues encountered in the experiment and the advent of more modern motive power in the form of 0-8-0 switchers (both acquired secondhand from the Chesapeake & Ohio Railroad and built in the N&W’s own Roanoke Shops) did little to prolong the service lives of the already subpar M2’s.

Survivors
Two of the class Ms have survived into preservation. No. 475 is preserved and in operational condition at the Strasburg Rail Road in Lancaster, Pennsylvania. No. 433 is on static display outdoors at the head of the Virginia Creeper Trail in Abingdon, Virginia. 

Three M2s have also survived into preservation. No. 1134 has been cosmetically restored and is on display at the Railroad Museum of Virginia in Portsmouth, Virginia. No. 1118 is currently under the ownership of the National Railway Historical Society’s Roanoke Chapter. No. 1151 is part of the Virginia Museum of Transportation’s collection  in Roanoke. Both Nos. 1118 and 1151 have yet to be restored from scrapyard condition.

See also
 4-8-0
4-8-0 433
 4-8-0 475

References

 
 
 
 
 
 
 

M
4-8-0 locomotives
Baldwin locomotives
ALCO locomotives
Steam locomotives of the United States
Railway locomotives introduced in 1906
Freight locomotives
Standard gauge locomotives of the United States